Chen Yuanda (died 316), courtesy name Changhong, was a Xiongnu minister of Han Zhao during the Sixteen Kingdoms period. Yuanda joined Liu Yuan during his establishment of his state in 304, becoming a mainstay in its early years. During the reign of Liu Cong, Yuanda was persistent in going against his emperor's wishes that many at the time were seen as inappropriate, usually revolving around his empresses. In 316, he and a group of ministers fought against the corrupted eunuch, Wang Chen, and his inner circle after they won over Liu Cong. However, following the death of his friend Liu Yi (劉易) as a result of the debacle, Yuanda killed himself out of despair.

Early life and service under Liu Yuan 
Chen Yuanda was born into the Rear Division of the Southern Xiongnu. His family name was originally "Gao (高)", but supposedly, due to his birth month bringing misfortune to his father, he was forced to change it to "Chen (陳)". Yuanda was orphaned at an early age and grew up poor in Jinyang. He took a liking for reciting books and worked on the farms to sustain himself. Yuanda was knowledgeable, but was never received an invitation to serve from anyone of note until he reached the age of 40. 

When Liu Yuan became the Xiongnu Worthy Prince of the Left, he sought out to recruit Yuanda into his ranks. However, Yuanda ignored his call and sent no reply. Liu Yuan broke away from the Jin dynasty in 304, declaring himself King of Han. It was around this time when someone asked Yuanda if he was worried now that Liu Yuan was king. Yuanda replied, "I know him well, and he also understands my thoughts. Within two or three days, the letter will arrive." Surely enough, Liu Yuan approached him again, offering him the position of Gentleman of the Yellow Gates. This time, Yuanda accepted his offer. 

Liu Yuan was delighted that Yuanda had joined him, but wished that he had done earlier. Liu Yuan told him that had he came earlier, Yuanda would have had a higher position than what he had now. However, Yuanda replied, "The ministers are divided by nature, and those who are rash for power will surely fall. If I had joined earlier, I fear that you may elect me as one of the Nine Ministers or as a Receiver of Words. This is not the division of ministers. How can a minister be worthy of such treatment! So suppress these emotions, and wait for that division to come. The king would have no slander, and the ministers would be free from the calamity of the outsiders." Liu Yuan was pleased by his response.

Under Liu Yuan, Yuanda was a described as a loyal and trusted minister. He often gave advice to Liu Yuan and submitted private petitions that not even Liu Yuan's children knew its content.

Service under Liu Cong

Construction of Huangyi Hall 
Liu Yuan died in 310 and was succeeded by Liu He, although He was quickly assassinated and replaced through a coup by his brother, Liu Cong, that same year. Between 304 and 313, Yuanda grew to the position of Minister of Justice. In 313, Liu Cong made his Honoured Lady, Liu E as his empress. To honour her, Liu Cong built Huangyi Hall (䳨儀殿). Yuanda reprimanded Liu Cong for this, as Cong had already carried out many projects in the past. He states that now that Han was on the verge of replacing the Jin dynasty in the north, Liu Cong should present himself more frugally to the people and concentrate in spending the treasury on expelling the remaining Jin remnants. Liu Cong was insulted by Yuanda's rebuking, and ordered him to be executed.

As Chen Yuanda was brought out for his execution, he passed through Xiaoyao Garden (逍遙園) in Lizhong Court (李中堂), another one of Liu Cong's courts. He was being led under the trees of the court's garden when somehow, Yuanda managed to chain himself to one of the trees with the chains around his hands. The attendants tried to free him, but Yuanda refused to let them do so. As Yuanda delayed his execution, many of Liu Cong's ministers pleaded his innocence to Liu Cong to prevent his execution. Liu Cong made no response but soon enough, Liu E took notice of the situation. Liu E submitted her husband a petition asking him to spare Yuanda from death. 

With both his ministers and wife siding with Yuanda, Cong eventually pardoned him. Upon meeting Yuanda, he said, "You ought to be the one fearing me, but right now it is me who is fearing you." The two men reconciled, and Liu Cong even went as far as renaming Xiaoyao Garden to Naxian ("Receiving the Worthies") Garden and Lizhong Court to Kuixian ("Shamed by the Worthies") Court due to the incident.

Issue with Liu Cong's empresses 
In a bizarre story that supposedly took place in 313, a shooting star had fallen to the ground around Pingyang and transformed into a mass of flesh. Liu Cong was disturbed by this and asked his ministers their opinion on what this meant. Yuanda told him, "Women are being shown too much favour; this is an omen of the downfall of the state." Liu Cong replied, "What you say is purely based on yin and yang. How does this relate to human affairs?" Coincidentally, after the incident, Liu E would die.

In 315, Liu Cong made the controversial decision of having three empresses at once, them being Liu Guifei, Jin Yueguang and Jin Yuehua. Yuanda once again argued with him, telling him that it was against tradition to have more than one empress. Liu Cong was annoyed by this, so he secretly reduced Yuanda's power by moving him to a prestigious but also powerless position. However, many ministers protested this by offering to give their positions up to Yuanda, so Cong was forced to re-appoint him as Imperial Secretary. Later Jin Yueguang was caught conducting an immoral activity, so Yuanda sent a petition to Liu Cong in regard to it. Cong had no choice but to depose her. After her disposal, Yueguang killed herself out of shame. Cong was distraught by her death, and blamed Yuanda for causing this.

Conflict with Wang Chen and death 
The next year in 316, Liu Cong began to place an excessive amount of trust in his eunuch, Wang Chen. Wang Chen and his inner circle were despised by Liu Cong's minister as they continued to curry his favour while living lavishly and removing their rivals. Yuanda was involved in a group effort to submit a petition denouncing Wang Chen and his partisans. However, Liu Cong's trust in Wang Chen was ingrained, and Cong dismissed their attempts to win him over again. 

As the political discourse continued to take place that year, one of Yuanda's closest friend, Liu Yi died shortly after Liu Cong had denied his petition. Liu Yi death greatly affected Yuanda, who became depress as a result. Shortly after his friend's passing, Yuanda returned to his home, where he committed suicide. Many of the ministers mourned their deaths, and felt that the two men had been unfairly treated.

References 

 Fang, Xuanling (ed.) (648). Book of Jin (Jin Shu).
 Sima, Guang  (1084). Zizhi Tongjian

Former Zhao people
316 deaths